Helium is the fourth studio album by Canadian musician Peter Sagar, under his solo project Homeshake. It was released on February 15, 2019 through Sinderlyn Records. In an interview with Flaunt Magazine, Peter explained his songwriting on this record process: “I just make songs and then try to string them together as well as I can. People I think often expect there to be premeditated thoughts in the way that I make music, but it’s really just that I make a lot of songs and then the ones that stick, that stay in my head, I finish, and then I do my best to glue them together in the album.”

Track listing

Charts

References

2019 albums
Homeshake albums